Gladys Pitcher (1890 – 1996) was an American music editor, teacher, and composer.

Biography
Pitcher was born in Belfast, Maine in 1890. She attended high school in Belfast and was considered for the Boston Globe scholarship contest in 1906 and received many votes towards it, including from people who were not from Belfast. She graduated from the New England Conservatory and completed postgraduate work in theory, composition, and cello. Pitcher taught at Beloit College and directed music at schools in Bennington, Vermont and Manchester, New Hampshire. She was the music editor for C.C. Birchard Company in Boston before moving back to Belfast, Maine. Her hymns and choral music have been used by schools throughout the United States.

Pitcher collaborated on vocal compositions with J. Lilian Vandevere, as well as on music education textbooks with Vandevere and M. Teresa Armitage; Peter W. Dykema, Donald Franklin Main; Hazel Nohavec Morgan; Floy Adele Rossman; Martha Powell Setchell; Herman F Smith; and D K Stevens.

She was awarded the second W.A. Diggins Award in 1958.

References

External links
The NATS Bulletin
Gladys Pitcher papers at the University of Maryland Libraries

American women composers
20th-century American composers
20th-century American women musicians
Musicians from Maine
1890 births
1996 deaths
New England Conservatory alumni
Beloit College faculty
People from Belfast, Maine
American centenarians
Women centenarians
20th-century women composers
American women academics